Johann Baptist Jenger (March 23, 1793 in Kirchhofen near Freiburg – March 30, 1856 in Vienna) was an Austrian composer, musician, secretary of the Steiermärkischen Musikvereins (Styrian Musical Society) and member of the board of the Gesellschaft der Musikfreunde (Society of Music Lovers) in Vienna.

References

External links
Porträt-Daguerreotypie 

1793 births
1856 deaths
Austrian male musicians
19th-century Austrian musicians
19th-century Austrian male musicians